Otto Zöckler (27 May 1833, Grünberg, Hesse – 19 February 1906) was a German theologian, professor at Greifswald. He edited a Handbuch der theologischen Wissenschaft, and other works.

Quote from him: “The wise man is also the just, pious, the upright, the man who walks in the way of truth.”

Publications

Ecclesiastes, or Koheleth - 1870
Commentary on the Book of Job, Vol 8 in Lange's Commentary on the Holy Scriptures - 1872
The Cross of Christ: Studies in the History of Religion and the Inner Life of the Church - 1877

References
Attribution

1833 births
1906 deaths
People from Grünberg, Hesse
19th-century German Protestant theologians
Academic staff of the University of Greifswald
19th-century German male writers
German male non-fiction writers